WECC-FM (89.3 FM) is a Christian radio station broadcasting a Contemporary Christian format. Licensed to Folkston, Georgia, United States, the station is currently owned by Lighthouse Christian Broadcasting Corporation. The station also broadcasts on 1190 AM, WWIO.

External links

ECC-FM